Elena Belci (born 31 May 1964) is an Italian speed skater. She competed at the 1988, 1992, 1994 and the 1998 Winter Olympics.

References

1964 births
Living people
Italian female speed skaters
Olympic speed skaters of Italy
Speed skaters at the 1988 Winter Olympics
Speed skaters at the 1992 Winter Olympics
Speed skaters at the 1994 Winter Olympics
Speed skaters at the 1998 Winter Olympics
Sportspeople from Turin